"Moving in Stereo" is a song by the American rock band the Cars. It appeared on their first album, The Cars, released in 1978. It was co-written by Ric Ocasek and the band's keyboard player Greg Hawkes, and sung by bassist Benjamin Orr.

Reception
Although not released as a single, "Moving in Stereo" received airplay on album-oriented rock radio stations in the United States, often coupled with the song "All Mixed Up" which it segues into on the album. The song continues to receive airplay on classic rock radio stations.

Donald A. Guarisco of AllMusic described the song as "one of the Cars' finest experimental tracks," noting that it "sounds like a new wave update of Eno-era Roxy Music."

A demo version recorded in 1977, featuring only Ocasek and Hawkes, was released on The Cars: Deluxe Edition in 1999.

Cover versions
 Fu Manchu on their tenth studio album, We Must Obey.
 Byzantine covered the song on their 2017 album The Cicada Tree.

In other media
An instrumental portion of "Moving in Stereo" was used prominently in the 1982 feature film Fast Times at Ridgemont High, in which it accompanies Judge Reinhold's character's fantasy of Phoebe Cates's character removing her bikini top while embracing him. Although the song was popularized in the movie, it was not included on the soundtrack album.

References

The Cars songs
1978 songs
Songs written by Ric Ocasek
Song recordings produced by Roy Thomas Baker